The Last Panthers is a studio album by English electronic musician Clark, released on Warp in 2016. It consists of music from and inspired by a television series of the same name.

It peaked at number 45 on the UK Independent Albums Chart.

Critical reception

At Metacritic, which assigns a weighted average score out of 100 to reviews from mainstream critics, the album received an average score of 79, based on 11 reviews, indicating "generally favorable reviews".

Track listing

Charts

References

External links
 

2016 albums
Clark (musician) albums
Warp (record label) albums